The Assistant Chief of the Defence Staff (ACDS) is a senior British military officer. There are a number of ACDS appointments and they are held by officers of two-star rank (rear admiral, air vice-marshal, or major general). They work in the Ministry of Defence.

Assistant Chief of the Defence Staff (Health)

The ACDS(H) reports to the Surgeon General.

 Surgeon Rear Admiral Lionel Jarvis (2008–2011)
 Major General Jeremy Rowan (2011–2014)
 Surgeon Rear Admiral Alasdair Walker (2014–2015)
 Major General Martin Bricknell (2015–2018)

Assistant Chief of the Defence Staff (Capability & Force Design)
 Air Vice-Marshal Graeme A. Robertson (1994–1996)
 Rear-Admiral Nigel R. Essenhigh (1996–1998)
 Major-General John P. Kiszely (1998–2001)
 Rear-Admiral Rory A.I. McLean (2001–2004)
 Rear-Admiral Timothy J.H. Laurence (2004–2007)
 Air Vice-Marshal Kevin J. Leeson (2007–2009)
 Rear-Admiral Alan D. Richards (2009–2011)
 Major-General Mark Poffley (2011–2014)
 Rear Admiral Tim Fraser (2014–2017)
 Air Vice-Marshal Richard Knighton (2017–2018)
 Major-General Robert Magowan (2018–2020)
 Rear Admiral Hugh Beard (2020-2022)
 Major-General David Eastman (2022-Present)

Assistant Chief of the Defence Staff (Military Strategy) later, Defence Engagement
 Major-General Alexander J.S. Storrie (2011–2013)
 Rear-Admiral Simon J. Ancona (2013–2017)
 Major-General Giles P. Hill (2017–2019)
 Major-General Stephen McMahon (2019-2020)
 Air Vice-Marshal Alastair P.T. Smith (2020-Present)

Assistant Chief of the Defence Staff (Intelligence Capability)

The ACDS(IC) reports to the Chief of Defence Intelligence.

 Major General Jerry Thomas (2009–2012)

Assistant Chief of the Defence Staff (Commitments)/(Operations, now Operations & Commitments)

 Rear Admiral David Brown (1980–1982)
 Air Vice-Marshal Clive Loader (2002–2004)
 Major General Nick Houghton (2004–2005)
 Major General Chris Nickols (2005–2008)
 Air Vice-Marshal Andrew Pulford (2008–2010)
 Major General David Capewell (2010–2011)
 Air Vice-Marshal Bob Judson (2011–2013)
 Major General Patrick Sanders (2013–2015)
 Air Vice-Marshal Edward Stringer (2015–2017)
 Air Vice-Marshal Andrew Turner (2017–2019)
 Major General Charles Stickland (2019–2021)
 Air Vice-Marshal Allan Marshall (2021–present)

Assistant Chief of the Defence Staff (Personnel Capability)

Since 1992, the Defence Services Secretary has usually holds the appointment of ACDS(P) as a secondary role.

 Major General Brian Pennicott (1992–1994)
 Air Vice-Marshal Peter John Harding (1994–1998)
 Rear Admiral Rodney Lees (1998–2001)
 Major General Christopher Elliot (2001–2004)
 Air Vice-Marshal David Pocock (2004–2005)
 Rear Admiral Peter Wilkinson (2005–2007)
 Major General Matthew Sykes (2009–2010)
 Air Vice-Marshal David Murray (2010–2012)
 Rear Admiral Simon Williams (2012–2015)
 Major General Richard Nugee (2015–2016)
 Air Vice-Marshal Garry Tunnicliffe (2016–2019)
 Rear-Admiral James Macleod (2019–2022)
 Rear-Admiral Philip Hally (2022- present)

Assistant Chief of the Defence Staff (Policy)

 Air Vice-Marshal John Gingell (1975–1978)
 Rear Admiral Jock Slater (1985–1987)
 Air Vice-Marshal David Hobart (2001–2004)
 Major General Andrew Stewart (2004–2006)
 Rear Admiral Alan Richards (2006–2009)
 Major General Jonathan Shaw (2009–2012)

Assistant Chief of the Defence Staff (Reserves and Cadets)
The ACDS(R&C) is the senior reservist of the British Armed Forces. They are responsible for tri-service policy relating to the reserves and cadet forces. The appointment was created in 2004.

 Major General Gerald Grosvenor, 6th Duke of Westminster (2004–2007) 
 Major General Simon Lalor (2007–2010)
 Major General Greg Smith (2010–2013)
 Major General John Crackett (2013–2016)
 Major General Ranald Munro (2016–2019)
 Major General Simon Brooks-Ward (2019-2022)
 Major General Marc Overton (2022–present)

References

External links
 

British military appointments